Talkhab-e Riz (also Romanized as Talkhāb-e Rīz; also known as Talkhāb) is a village in Ahram Rural District, in the Central District of Tangestan County, Bushehr Province, Iran. At the 2006 census, its population was 18, in 4 families.

References 

Populated places in Tangestan County